Santa Maria in Torricella is a Roman Catholic church, located in Piacenza, Italy.

The church was built in 1514 to house an icon of the Virgin in a chapel at the site. This church was used to provide religious consolation to those condemned to death (the scaffold was near the square). This service was provided by the Capuchins order, established in the church by Bishop Burali to take the role from the Confraternity of San Giovanni. The first church was enlarged in the mid-seventeenth century . The church has a canvas of a Beato Paolo Burali by Gaspare Landi, a Crucifixon by Robert de Longe, and a St Disma by Giuseppe Gherardi.

References

Roman Catholic churches in Piacenza
16th-century Roman Catholic church buildings in Italy
Renaissance architecture in Piacenza
Roman Catholic churches completed in 1514